Stanley Weber (born 13 July 1986) is a French actor and theatre director. He is known for his performance as Juan Borgia in the television series Borgia, and for his roles in films  The First Day of the Rest of Your Life and Thérèse Desqueyroux as well as Violette.

Early life and education 

Stanley Weber was born on 13 July 1986 in Paris, France, to actor Jacques Weber and his wife Christine. He has a sister, Kim, and a brother, Tommy.

Weber received his first acting lessons at Cours Florent, and then enrolled acting at the Conservatoire national supérieur d'art dramatique. He also studied at the London Academy of Music and Dramatic Art.

Theatre

Filmography

References

External links 

 Official Website
 
 Staney Weber at ECI Global Talent Management

1985 births
Living people
Male actors from Paris
French male film actors
French male stage actors
French male television actors
French theatre directors
French National Academy of Dramatic Arts alumni
Cours Florent alumni
21st-century French male actors
Alumni of the London Academy of Music and Dramatic Art